Immingham (Eastern Jetty) railway station was a special excursion station built along the port's eastern jetty to cater for traffic to passenger ships on cruises to the North Cape, Norwegian Fjords and the Baltic.

The station was not much more than a long wooden platform along the jetty. It was only used for the transfer of the passengers and luggage from train to ship and vice versa so little in the way of facilities was needed or provided. The critical provision was numerous staff to guide travellers and handle their belongings.

Traffic
The cruise ships sometimes berthed in the dock itself, but usually they moored at the seaward side of the jetty where they were adjacent to all-First Class, Restaurant Car special trains. These operated along two routes: 
In both cases they then used the main line via .

Locomotives
Originally these trains were hauled by Great Central Railway 4-6-0 locomotives but following grouping in 1922 Great Northern Railway motive power took many of them over.

Spectacle
Visits by such ships drew crowds of sightseers and passed into local folklore, none more so than the vessel  which was torpedoed in 1940 with heavy loss of life.

Closure
The cruises terminated in 1939, just prior to the Second World War. Although the platform remained for some time, the station was effectively closed. One source suggests GCR passenger vessels plied between here, Antwerp, Hamburg and Rotterdam.

Afterlife
By 2015 the tracks on the jetty had long been lifted, but the structure remained well used, handling oils, spirits, and liquid chemicals.

Liners known to have used Immingham
SS Arandora Star
SS Avon
SS Calgaric
SS Empress of Australia
SS Orford
SS Orontes

References

Sources

External links
 The Eastern Jetty and tracks on a 1932 OS map National Library of Scotland
 The station Rail Map Online
 The Eastern Jetty in modern times World Port Source
 The Eastern Jetty and tracks Britain from Above (free login needed to zoom)
 Cruise ship train arriving at the Eastern Jetty Getty Images

Disused railway stations in the Borough of North East Lincolnshire
Railway stations in Great Britain opened in 1912
Railway stations in Great Britain closed in 1939
Former Great Central Railway stations
Immingham